Halvor Steenerson (June 30, 1852 – November 22, 1926) was an American Republican politician who served as a member of the United States House of Representatives from Minnesota's 9th congressional district from 1903 to 1923.

Background
Halvor Steenerson was born at Pleasant Springs near Madison Dane County, Wisconsin. He moved with his parents to Sheldon, Houston County, Minnesota, in 1853.  He attended Houston County Elementary School and graduated from Rushford High School in Rushford, Minnesota. He studied law at the Union College of Law in Chicago. He was admitted to the bar in 1878 and commenced practice in Lanesboro, Minnesota.

Steenerson married Mary Christofferson (1851–1925) in 1878, and they had four children together, all of whom predeceased them. Their last surviving child, Benjamin Gilbert Steenerson (1884–1908), drowned while attempting to rescue a fellow Marine Corps member that had fallen overboard.

Career
Steenerson moved to Crookston Polk County, Minnesota in 1880. He served as prosecuting attorney of Polk County 1881 – 1883; as city attorney of Crookston; as a member of the Minnesota Senate 1883 – 1887; and as delegate to the Republican National Conventions in 1884 and 1888. While serving in the state senate, Steenerson served on the committees for the Hospital for Insane, Indian Affairs, Joint University and University Lands, Judiciary and the State Prison.

Steenerson was elected as a Republican to the 58th, 59th, 60th, 61st, 62nd, 63rd, 64th, 65th, 66th, and 67th congresses, (March 4, 1903 – March 3, 1923). He was chairman of the Committee on Militia (60th and 61st congresses) and served on the Committee on Post Office and Post Roads (66th and 67th congresses).

Steenerson was an unsuccessful candidate for reelection in 1922 to the 68th congress, when he was defeated by Knud Wefald. He served as  vice president of the American group of the Inter-Parliamentary Union. He resumed the practice of law in Crookston, Minnesota.

Steenerson died of apoplexy on November 22, 1926 at a hospital in Grand Forks, North Dakota. He is buried at Oakdale Cemetery in Crookston, Polk County, Minnesota.

Steenerson is the namesake of Steenerson Township, Beltrami County, Minnesota.

References

Additional sources

External links

 

Republican Party Minnesota state senators
1852 births
1926 deaths
Northwestern University Pritzker School of Law alumni
American people of Norwegian descent
People from Pleasant Springs, Wisconsin
Republican Party members of the United States House of Representatives from Minnesota